The 2nd constituency of Baranya County is one of the single member constituencies of the National Assembly, the national legislature of Hungary. The constituency standard abbreviation: Baranya 02. OEVK.

Since 2014, it has been represented by Péter Hoppál of the Fidesz–KDNP party alliance.

Geography
The 2nd constituency is located in central part of Baranya County.

List of municipalities
The constituency includes the following municipalities:

Members
The constituency was first represented by Péter Hoppál of the Fidesz from 2014, and he was re-elected in 2018 and 2022.

References

Baranya 2nd